The Briegleb BG-12 is a single-seat sailplane of wooden construction developed in the United States in the 1950s. It was marketed for homebuilding in plans or kit form, with over 350 sets of plans selling by 1978. The BG-12 is a conventional sailplane design, with a high cantilever wing and a conventional empennage. Later models featured a highly revised fuselage, a swept-forward tail fin, and an all flying tailplane with balance tabs.

Variants
BG-12
prototype derived from BG-6
BG-12A
Initial market version
BG-12B
1963 version with revised wing
BG-12BD
BG-12B with revised wing and ailerons
BG-12C
Flapless 15 metre wing to meet FAI Standard Class requirements, one built.
BG-12/16
Revised, lower-drag fuselage and tail fin, all flying tailplane
Jobagy Bagyjo
BG-12 fuselage and empennage with Cherokee II Wings. Built in 1962 by John Jobagy, currently on display at the Aero Space Museum of Calgary
Niedrauer NG-1
BG-12/16 fuselage shortened 9 inches and lengthened to accommodate reclined pilot position. BG-12B Horizontal tail. Airfoil changed to a NACA 4400 series.

Aircraft on display
US Southwest Soaring Museum
Aero Space Museum of Calgary
National Soaring Museum

Specifications (BG 12BD)

See also
Briegleb El Mirage Airfield

References

 
 sailplanedirectory.com
 plans sheet 12046

1950s United States sailplanes
Glider aircraft
Homebuilt aircraft
BG-12
Aircraft first flown in 1956